Port Nelson Airport or New Port Nelson Airport  is an airport located near Port Nelson, on Rum Cay in The Bahamas.

Facilities

References

External links
 
 

Airports in the Bahamas